The Sardinian regional election of 1961 took place on 18 June 1961.

Two more seats were added.

After the election Efisio Corrias, the incumbent Christian Democratic President, formed a new government that included the Sardinian Action Party, a social-liberal regionalist party. In 1963 the government was enlarged to the Italian Democratic Socialist Party.

Results

Sources: Regional Council of Sardinia and Istituto Cattaneo

References

Elections in Sardinia
1961 elections in Italy